Onni Armas Lappalainen (30 July 1922, in Mikkeli – 12 January 1971, in Mikkeli) was a Finnish gymnast who competed in the 1952 Summer Olympics and in the 1956 Summer Olympics.

References

1922 births
1971 deaths
People from Mikkeli
Finnish male artistic gymnasts
Olympic gymnasts of Finland
Gymnasts at the 1952 Summer Olympics
Gymnasts at the 1956 Summer Olympics
Olympic bronze medalists for Finland
Olympic medalists in gymnastics
Medalists at the 1956 Summer Olympics
Medalists at the 1952 Summer Olympics
Sportspeople from South Savo
20th-century Finnish people